Prince Henrik of Denmark (born Henri Marie Jean André de Laborde de Monpezat; 11 June 1934 – 13 February 2018) was the husband of Margrethe II of Denmark. He served as her royal consort from Margrethe's accession on 14 January 1972 until his death on 13 February 2018.

Henrik was born in the French commune of Talence near Bordeaux to an old French family, the Laborde de Monpezats. He spent his early years in Tonkin in French Indochina (now part of Vietnam), where his family had lived for many years. The family spent the Second World War at the family home in Cahors, France. They returned to French Indochina after the war. However, they were forced to flee following the defeat of the French in the First Indochina War. After completing his education in France and Vietnam, Henrik served in the French Army during the Algerian War. Prior to his marriage to Margrethe, he worked in the diplomatic service. He married Margrethe at the Holmen Church on 10 June 1967 and became her prince consort when she succeeded her father, King Frederick IX, as monarch of Denmark on 14 January 1972.

He had two sons, Crown Prince Frederik (born 1968) and Prince Joachim (born 1969), and eight grandchildren. Throughout his time as prince consort, Henrik voiced his displeasure with never being granted the title of king. A keen winemaker, Henrik produced his own wine at his estate in France. He also published many works of poetry. He was the first male consort to a Danish monarch. Henrik retired from his royal duties on 1 January 2016, at the age of 81. He died at Fredensborg Palace on 13 February 2018, after a short illness.

Early life

Henrik was born in Talence, Gironde, France. He was the son of André de Laborde de Monpezat (6 May 1907 in Mont-de-Marsan – 23 February 1998 in Le Cayrou) and his partner Renée Leuret, née Doursenot (26 October 1908 in Périgueux – 11 February 2001 in Le Cayrou), who was then married to Prof. Louis Leuret (1881–1962) whom she divorced only in 1940. André de Laborde de Monpezat and Renée Doursenot were married in 1948. He had two younger brothers, Étienne and Jean-Baptiste, and two older sisters, Françoise, Mme. Bardin and Maurille, Mme. Beauvillain (died 2015). He was raised as a Catholic.

He spent his first five years in Hanoi in Tonkin in French Indochina (now part of Vietnam), where his father looked after family business interests. In 1939, the family returned to Le Cayrou, where they remained during the Second World War. Henrik received homeschooling until 1947, when he went to a Jesuit school in Bordeaux. He returned to Hanoi in Tonkin in 1950, where increasing unrest forced him to fight the Việt Minh, to protect his family's lands. He graduated from the French secondary school in Hanoi in 1952. Originally wanting to study to become a pianist at Conservatoire de Paris, he instead chose an education more in line with his father's wishes. Between 1952 and 1957 he simultaneously studied law and political science at the Sorbonne, Paris, and Chinese and Vietnamese at the École Nationale des Langues Orientales (now known as INALCO). He also studied in Hong Kong in 1957 and Saigon in 1958.

He served as an infantry conscript in the French Army in the Algerian War between 1959 and 1962. He then joined the French Foreign Ministry, working as a Secretary at the embassy in London from 1963 to 1967. While there, he met Princess Margrethe, who was studying at the London School of Economics. The couple secretly dated for a year before Henrik proposed.

Marriage

On 10 June 1967 he married Princess Margrethe, the heir presumptive to the Danish throne, at the Naval Church of Copenhagen. At the time of the wedding his name was Danicised to Henrik and he was given the title HRH Prince Henrik of Denmark. Prior to the wedding, the Prince converted to Lutheranism. The Queen and Prince Henrik had two children, Crown Prince Frederik and Prince Joachim, and eight grandchildren.

Prince Henrik's native language was French, and his second language was Danish. He also spoke fluent English, German, Chinese, and Vietnamese. Although he quickly learned Danish after marrying Margrethe, Danes joked about his grasp of Danish and his thick French accent.

Difficulties with the Danish monarchy

When Queen Margrethe II ascended the throne, Henrik became the first male consort in Danish history. This meant there were no clear descriptions of his duties. He defined his own role as a supporter of and counsellor to the Queen. However, he felt frustrated with the lack of recognition in title, stating that there was no way to differentiate between his own title and those of his sons and grandsons.

In 2002, Prince Henrik fled Denmark to France and went to stay at the couple's Château de Cayx in Cahors in southern France. The cause of his departure from Denmark was a New Year's Day reception in which his son, Crown Prince Frederik, had been appointed as host in the absence of Queen Margrethe. Henrik felt "pushed aside, degraded and humiliated" by being relegated to "third place in the royal hierarchy".

"For many years, I have been Denmark's number two", he said. "I have been satisfied with that role, but I don't want to be relegated to number three after so many years." Henrik "fled" Denmark to reflect on his status in the Danish Royal Family. Queen Margrethe flew to France to meet her husband. Henrik stressed that neither his wife nor son were to blame for the incident. The Prince Consort spent three weeks in Caix, and did not appear with his wife as expected at the wedding of Willem-Alexander of the Netherlands and Máxima Zorreguieta. After three weeks, Henrik returned to Denmark.

On 30 April 2008, shortly before the wedding of his younger son, Prince Joachim, to Marie Cavallier, the Queen conferred the new Danish title "Count of Monpezat" on both of her sons and made it hereditary for their male-line descendants, both male and female. The Queen's private secretary Henning Fode commented, "The Queen and the Prince Consort have considered this for quite some time, and it has led to the belief that it was the right thing to do." In fact, Henrik had mentioned this possibility as far back as 1996 in his published memoir: "During our generation, the future sovereign will perhaps receive approval to see 'Monpezat' added to the dynastic name of 'Oldenburg-Glücksburg'". While being interviewed by the French weekly Point de Vue in October 2005, Henrik raised the issue shortly after the birth of Crown Prince Frederik's first son, Prince Christian, who is expected to inherit the Danish crown one day: "It also makes him very proud and happy that Monpezat will be added to this small grandson's future name as Prince of Denmark. 'It is a great joy for me that his French roots will also be remembered.'"

In her New Year's speech to the Danish people on 31 December 2015, Queen Margrethe announced that Prince Henrik would 'wind down' and give up most of his official duties beginning on 1 January 2016. On 14 April 2016, Prince Henrik renounced the title of Prince Consort, which he had been given in 2005.

Cultural interests and hobbies

Like his wife, Prince Henrik was deeply interested in art and culture. He was particularly fond of wooden figures and jade, building up collections which he exhibited in 2017 at the museum in Koldinghus. Although he never achieved his ambition of becoming a concert pianist, he continued to play the piano throughout his life. In 2013, he accompanied the pop group Michael Learns to Rock on the piano as they recorded "Echo", a number which was presented to the king of Thailand.

Henrik wrote many poems in his native language (French), some of which have been published in the collections Chemin faisant (1982), Cantabile (2000), Les escargots de Marie Lanceline (2003), Murmures de vent (2005), Frihjul (Roue-Libre, 2010), Fabula (2011), La part des anges (2013), and Dans mes nuits sereines (2014). The symphonic suite Cantabile by Frederik Magle is based on Henrik's poetry collection Cantabile and was premiered by the Danish National Symphony Orchestra at two concerts celebrating Henrik's 70th and 75th birthdays in 2004 and 2009. Henrik said about writing poetry (translated from Danish): "I see poetry as an opportunity for immersion in a superficial time dominated by news and entertainment that makes us rootless and restless. Poetry takes us closer to the true nature of the world, in poetry we can approach the eternal questions such as love, loneliness and death."

Henrik was also an excellent cook, inspired by French gastronomic traditions. He usually planned the family meals in collaboration with the court chef, always including his own spices on the table, some from his childhood estates in Asia. In addition to his cookbooks, Henrik often appeared in television programmes showing how he prepared meals in Fredensborg Castle in Denmark or at his French home, the Château de Cayx.

Death
In August 2017, Henrik announced he did not wish to be buried next to the Queen, citing his longtime complaint of only being named Prince Consort, and not King Consort. The decision is said to have broken a tradition that began in 1559, and at the time, Queen Margrethe is said to have accepted her husband's decision.

On 6 September 2017, it was announced that Prince Henrik was suffering from dementia. On 28 January 2018, he was hospitalized at Rigshospitalet, following a visit to Egypt. It was later revealed that he had a benign tumor in the left lung. His health however worsened, causing Crown Prince Frederik to cut short his visit to South Korea where he was to attend the 2018 Winter Olympics in Pyeongchang. On 13 February 2018, Prince Henrik was transferred from Rigshospitalet to Fredensborg Palace, where the Danish Royal Court stated he wished to spend the remaining days of his life. The Royal Court added that the condition of the Prince remained serious. On 14 February 2018, it was announced that Prince Henrik had died in his sleep at Fredensborg Palace late on 13 February, surrounded by his wife and sons.

Following his death, the Court announced there would be a month of royal mourning. Henrik's casket was placed in The Palace Chapel at Christiansborg for a castrum doloris, where in the following two days, more than 19,000 people went to pay their respects. He was cremated, after a funeral in Christianborg Palace Chapel in Copenhagen, on 20 February, with half of the ashes scattered across Danish seas and half placed in the private part of the gardens at Fredensborg Palace.

Issue

Prince Henrik had two sons and eight grandchildren, all born at Rigshospitalet in Copenhagen:

Crown Prince Frederik (born 26 May 1968). He is married to Mary Donaldson on 14 May 2004 at Copenhagen Cathedral, Copenhagen. The couple have four children:
Prince Christian (born 15 October 2005)
Princess Isabella (born 21 April 2007)
Prince Vincent (born 8 January 2011)
Princess Josephine (born 8 January 2011)
Prince Joachim (born 7 June 1969). He was married to Alexandra Manley on 18 November 1995 at Frederiksborg Palace Church, Hillerød. They divorced on 8 April 2005. He was married secondly to Marie Cavallier on 24 May 2008 at Møgeltønder Church, Møgeltønder. Joachim has four children; three sons and one daughter:
Count Nikolai (born 28 August 1999)
Count Felix (born 22 July 2002)
Count Henrik (born 4 May 2009)
Countess Athena (born 24 January 2012)

In 2008, Queen Margrethe II announced that her male-line descendants would bear the additional title of Count or Countess of Monpezat, in recognition of Prince Henrik's ancestry.

Titles, styles and honours

Titles and styles
Before 10 June 1967: Count Henri de Laborde de Monpezat (courtesy title without any legal basis)*
10 June 1967 – 2005: His Royal Highness Prince Henrik of Denmark 
2005 – 14 April 2016: His Royal Highness The Prince Consort of Denmark
14 April 2016 – 13 February 2018: His Royal Highness Prince Henrik of Denmark
* Use is disputed, see section "French nobility and French title of "count" controversy" below

French nobility and French title of "count" controversy
Since late in the nineteenth century, some members of the Laborde de Monpezat family bear a title of "count", but this title is a courtesy title without any legal basis.

Neither the French nobility of the de Laborde de Monpezat family nor this French title of "count" are acknowledged as historically or legally valid by most recent reference authors, specialists of the French nobility who do not consider that the de Laborde de Monpezat family belongs to the French nobility. This family is listed in the Encyclopédie de la fausse noblesse et de la noblesse d'apparence  his name is not in the Catalogue de la noblesse française (2002) from Régis Valette and the author Charondas describes in his book A quel titre (Volume 37, 1970) the Laborde de Monpezat as "false nobles, low folk in the 17th century, not received in the states of Béarn due to 'alleged nobility and as having never had nobility in their family." The family's surname was "Monpezat" by the time of the French Revolution, without title, until 14 July 1860, when it was changed by imperial decree to "de Laborde-Monpezat", and legally changed again on 19 May 1861 to "de Laborde de Monpezat".

Although Danish law never required that royal spouses be of aristocratic origin, no heir's marriage to a person who lacked male-line descent from royalty or titled nobility had been accepted as dynastic by the sovereign in the course of Denmark's history as a hereditary monarchy, until the marriage of the heir presumptive, Princess Margrethe, in June 1967 to "Count" Henri de Laborde de Monpezat. Six months later Margrethe's first cousin, Prince Ingolf of Denmark, married an untitled commoner and was demoted to a count, and when another cousin, Prince Christian of Denmark, also wed a Dane, Anne Dorte Maltoft-Nielsen, in 1971, he forfeited his dynastic position.

Honours

National honours and awards
National honours:
 :
 Knight of the Order of the Elephant (R.E.)
 Grand Commander of the Order of Dannebrog (S.Kmd.)
 Recipient of the Cross of Honour of the Order of the Dannebrog (D.Ht.)
 Recipient of the 50th Birthday Medal of Queen Margrethe II
 Recipient of the 50th Anniversary Medal of the Wedding of Queen Margrethe II and Prince Henrik
 Recipient of the 75th Birthday Medal of Queen Margrethe II
 Recipient of the Ruby Jubilee Medal of Queen Margrethe II
 Recipient of the 70th Birthday Medal of Queen Margrethe II
 Recipient of the 75th Birthday Medal of HRH the Prince Consort
 Recipient of the Silver Jubilee Medal of Queen Margrethe II
 Recipient of the 100th Anniversary Medal of the Birth of King Frederik IX
 Recipient of the Queen Ingrid Commemorative Medal
 Recipient of the 50th Anniversary Medal of the arrival of Queen Ingrid to Denmark
 Recipient of the Defence Medal for Excellent Service
 Recipient of the Homeguard Medal of Merit
 Recipient of the Red Cross Medal of Honour
 Recipient of the Danish Red Cross Medal for Merit
 Recipient of the Medal of Honour of the League of Civil Defense
 Recipient of the Medal of Honor of the Reserve Officers League
 Recipient of the Military Athletic Medal of Honour
 :
 Recipient of the Recipient of the Nersornaat Medal for Meritorious Service, 1st Class

Foreign honours and awards
Foreign honours:
 : Grand Star of the Decoration of Honour for Services to the Republic of Austria
 : Grand Cordon of the Order of Leopold I
 : Grand Cross of Order of the Southern Cross
 : Grand Cross of the Order of the Balkan Mountains
 : Grand Cross of the Order of Queen Jelena
 : Grand Cordon of the Order of the Nile
 : Member 1st Class of the Order of the Cross of Terra Mariana
 : Commander Grand Cross of the Order of the White Rose
 :
 Grand Cross of the Order of the Legion of Honour in Diamonds
 Grand Cross of the National Order of Merit
 Commander of the Order of Agricultural Merit
 Recipient of the North Africa Security and Order Operations Commemorative Medal
 : Grand Cross Special Class of the Order of Merit of the Federal Republic of Germany
 : Grand Cross of the Order of Honour
 : Grand Cross of the Order of the Falcon
 : Knight Grand Cross of the Order of Merit of the Italian Republic
 : Grand Cordon of the Order of the Chrysanthemum
 : Grand Cordon of the Supreme Order of the Renaissance
 : Commander Grand Cross of the Order of the Three Stars
 : Grand Cross of the Order of Vytautas the Great
 : Knight of the Order of the Gold Lion of the House of Nassau
 : Grand Cross of the Order of Ouissam Alaouite
 : Sash of Special Category of the Order of the Aztec Eagle
 : Knight Grand Cross of the Order of the Netherlands Lion
  Nepalese Royal Family: Member of the Order of the Benevolent Ruler
 : Grand Cross of the Order of Saint Olav
 : Grand Cordon of the Order of Merit of the Republic of Poland
 :
 Grand Cross of the Order of Christ
 Grand Cross of the Order of Aviz 
 : Grand Cross of the Order of the Star of Romania
 : Grand Cross of the Order of the White Double Cross
 : Grand Gwanghwa Medal of the Order of Diplomatic Service Merit
 : Knight Grand Cross of the Order of Charles III
 :
 Knight of the Royal Order of the Seraphim
 Recipient of the 85th Birthday Medal of King Gustaf VI Adolf
 Recipient of the 50th Birthday Medal of King Carl XVI Gustaf
 Recipient of the Ruby Jubilee Medal of King Carl XVI Gustaf
 : Knight Grand Cross of the Order of Chula Chom Klao
 :
 Honorary Knight Grand Cross of the Order of the Bath
 Honorary Knight Grand Cross of the Order of St Michael and St George
 Honorary Knight Grand Cross of the Royal Victorian Order
: Great Star of the Order of the Yugoslav Star

Publications
Prince Henrik translated several books into Danish and published several other books.

In 1981, under the pseudonym H.M. Vejerbjerg he and the Queen translated Simone de Beauvoir's Tous les hommes sont mortels.
Chemin faisant, 1982, a volume of French poems.
Destin oblige, 1996, his memoirs as Prince Consort.
Ikke Altid Gåselever (not always foie gras), 1999, a selection of favourite recipes.
Cantabile, 2000, poems.
Les escargots de Marie Lanceline, 2003.
Murmures de vent, 2005, poems.
Frihjul, 2010, poems.

References

Bibliography

External links

Official website
The Ancestry of Henri de Laborde de Monpezat

1934 births
2018 deaths
Converts to Lutheranism from Roman Catholicism
Danish people of French descent
Danish princes
French Army personnel
French emigrants to Denmark
French military personnel of the Algerian War
French nobility
House of Monpezat
Naturalised citizens of Denmark
People from Talence

Grand Commanders of the Order of the Dannebrog

Recipients of the Order of the Cross of Terra Mariana, 1st Class
Grand Croix of the Légion d'honneur
Knights Grand Cross of the Order of Chula Chom Klao
Knights Grand Cross of the Order of the Falcon
Knights Grand Cross of the Order of Merit of the Italian Republic
Honorary Knights Grand Cross of the Order of the Bath
Honorary Knights Grand Cross of the Order of St Michael and St George
Honorary Knights Grand Cross of the Royal Victorian Order
Grand Crosses of the Order of Aviz
Grand Crosses of the Order of Christ (Portugal)
Grand Crosses of the Order of Honour (Greece)
Grand Crosses of the Order of Merit of the Republic of Poland
Grand Crosses of the Order of the Star of Romania
Grand Crosses of the Order of Vytautas the Great
Recipients of the Grand Decoration with Sash for Services to the Republic of Austria
Grand Crosses Special Class of the Order of Merit of the Federal Republic of Germany
Danish male poets
INALCO alumni
Recipients of Nersornaat
Danish royal consorts
20th-century Danish poets
21st-century Danish poets
People from Copenhagen